Evangelical Lutheran Church in Madhya Pradesh is a Church belonging to the Lutheran denomination in India. It has about 22,000 members. The head office is situated in Chhindwara, Madhya Pradesh. It is affiliated with United Evangelical Lutheran Church in India, National Council of Churches in India, Lutheran World Federation and Christian Conference of Asia.
It is currently led by Bishop Rt. Rev. Surendra Sukka It exists since 1923.
The other churches belonging to the United Evangelical Lutheran Church in India are:
Andhra Evangelical Lutheran Church
Arcot Lutheran Church
Evangelical Lutheran Church in the Himalayan States
Good Samaritan Evangelical Lutheran Church
Gossner Evangelical Lutheran Church in Chotanagpur and Assam
Indian Evangelical Lutheran Church
Jeypore Evangelical Lutheran Church
Northern Evangelical Lutheran Church
South Andhra Lutheran Church
Tamil Evangelical Lutheran Church

References

External links
 Website of the United Evangelical Lutheran Church in India

See also
 Adivasi
 Christianity in India
 Christianity in Madhya Pradesh

Christianity in Madhya Pradesh
Lutheran World Federation members
Lutheranism in India
Christian organizations established in 1949
1949 establishments in India
Affiliated institutions of the National Council of Churches in India